Mukar is a rural locality (a selo) in Urinsky Selsoviet, Laksky District, Republic of Dagestan, Russia. The population was 220 as of 2010.

Geography 
Mukar is located 15 km northwest of Kumukh (the district's administrative centre) by road, on the right bank of the Kunikh River. Uri and Khuty are the nearest rural localities.

Nationalities 
Laks live there.

References 

Rural localities in Laksky District